Acentronichthys leptos is the only species of catfish (order Siluriformes) in the genus Acentronichthys of the family Heptapteridae. This species occurs in coastal streams in Brazil from Rio de Janeiro to Santa Catarina State, in São Mateus, Espírito Santo State and on Leopoldina, Minas Gerais.

References

Heptapteridae
Monotypic freshwater fish genera
Catfish genera
Catfish of South America
Freshwater fish of Brazil
Taxa named by Carl H. Eigenmann
Taxa named by Rosa Smith Eigenmann